The phonology of Māori is typical for a Polynesian language, with its phonetic inventory being one of the smallest in the world with considerable variation in realisation. The Māori language retains the  Proto-Polynesian syllable structure: (C)V(V(V)), with no closed syllables. The stress pattern is unpredictable, unlike in many other Polynesian languages.

Phonemes 
The sound system of Māori is conservative; it is close to the system the Proto-Central Eastern Polynesian language had. Most Māori dialects have 10 consonant and 5 vowel phonemes.

Despite the widely-held belief that the Māori phonetic system is simple and straightforward, in reality the realisation of Māori phonemes differs significantly; it depends on the speaker's age, the chosen register and other factors.

In an average text, vowels make up slightly more than 60% of all the phonemes. Several combinations are extremely rare: , ; also  and  can only be found in loanwords. The first two combinations are rare because *f + rounded vowel became merged with *s > ; the second pair is not attested in any reconstructions of the Proto-Polynesian language.

Consonants 

Devoicing of sonorants has also been attested in the same environment.

In loanwords,  affects surrounding vowels by making them more close.

In hoa ('friend')  becomes labialised .

The  phoneme is most frequently realised as a tap, .

Vowels 

The number of phonemes is small, so their realisation varies considerably.

Partly due to the influence of New Zealand English, most younger speakers now realise them as central vowels, that is, .

Due to the influence of the New Zealand English realisation of /e/ as [e̝], the mid front  as well as its long counterpart  are variably merged with the close front , so that pī and kē as well as piki and kete are pronounced similarly.

Phrase-final vowels can be reduced. This is especially true for short vowels, but it happens to long ones as well in fast speech.

For Māori monophthongs there are minimal pairs differentiated by vowel length:
 kēkē ('armpit') ~ keke ('pie')
 kākā ('New Zealand kaka') ~ kaka ('stem')
 kōkō ('tui') ~ koko ('shovel')
 kīkī ('to speak') ~ kiki ('to kick')
 kūkū ('New Zealand pigeon') ~ kuku ('fear')

Long vowels are pronounced for approximately twice as long as their short counterparts.

Some linguists consider long vowels to be variants of the short ones, while others count them separately. The first approach is supported by the fact that long vowels prosodically behave in an identical way as vowel sequences. For example, the imperative marker /e/ has a zero variant before verbs with three or more morae: e noho 'sit down!' and e tū 'stand up!', but patua 'hit it!' and kīa 'say it!'.

The second approach is supported by the difference in quality between short vowels and the corresponding long vowels, with long vowels having a more peripheral position.

Beside monophthongs Māori has many diphthong vowel phonemes. Although any short vowel combinations are possible, researchers disagree on which combinations constitute diphthongs.

Phonotactics 
Māori phonotactics is often described using a term 'mora' which in this context is a combination of a short vowel and a preceding consonant (if present). Long vowels and diphthongs are counted as two moras. With these units it is easier to set up boundaries for reduplication, define allomorphs for some particles, and it also might be important to define the poetic meter of Māori poetry.
 kaumātua ('elder'):
 four syllables: 
 six moras: 

For example, when the word ako ('to learn') is reduplicated, the resulted word akoako ('give or take counsel') has the first syllable stressed, while the reduplication of oho ('to wake up')—ohooho ('to be awake')—often has the second syllable stressed. The reason is that  in the first example is a sequence of short vowels while  forms a single syllable peak.

Stress 
Most Polynesian languages stress the second to last mora of the word, but Māori stress follows many elaborate rules, which still remain not thoroughly understood. One of the rules requires assigning hierarchy to syllables, and if more than one syllable receives the highest rank, the first one gets stressed:
 syllables with long vowels or geminate clusters
 syllables with diphthongs
 syllables with short vowels

In addition to word stress, Māori has phrasal stress that falls on the second to last mora:
 Ko te rangatíra, o tēnei márae ('the rangatira of this marae')
 Ko te maráe, o tēnei rángatira ('the marae of this rangatira')

This rule can also be applied to words that were formed by adding productive passive and nominalisation suffixes:
 káranga ('call') > karánga-tia ('be called')
 rángatira ('chief') > rangatíra-tanga ('chiefdom')

In reduplicated words, the first syllable of the repeated sequence has primary stress while the secondary stress falls on the first syllable of the second reduplication:
 āníwanìwa ('rainbow')

The first syllable of the prefix whaka- ('to cause something') is never stressed, but if it is added to a word starting with a vowel and forms a diphthong or a long vowel, the resulting syllable moves higher in the syllable hierarchy and might get stressed: whakaputa ('to emerge; to publish'), but whakaako ('to teach').

Loanwords from English do not follow the rules at all. Many researchers mention considerable variation in stress patterns.

Historical phonology 

Reconstructions assume that Proto-Oceanic had 23 consonant phonemes, and only 13 remained in Proto-Polynesian: unvoiced and voiced stop consonants that contrasted in Proto-Oceanic merged, only three out of five nasal consonants remained, two more consonants disappeared completely, but at the same time Proto-Polynesian acquired vowel length distinction. Māori retains all five Proto-Oceanic vowels. From a phonotactic standpoint, Proto-Polynesian lost consonant clusters and syllable-final consonants, although their reflexes can still be found: the passive form of the word inu “to drink” is inumia, from *inum + ia.

NB:  is a very rare reflex of *f that is attested in five words as initial *faf- became , e.g. *fafine > wahine 'woman', *fafa > waha 'mouth'. The same outcome of initial *faf- is also found in other Central Eastern Polynesian languages, e.g. Hawaiian ( 'woman',  'mouth').

Generally speaking, the Proto-Polynesian *f >  before labialised vowels, but is  initially before non-labialised vowels. Exceptions are likely reflecting that the merge of *f and *s took considerable time. The  ~  variation is also seen in dialects: *fea >  in western dialects of the North Island, but  in eastern dialects.

Many homophones were formed due to the phonetic inventory shrinking: for example, the word tau ('suitable') and the word tau ('season') go back to Proto-Polynesian *tau and *taqu, respectively. Another consequence of this change is the frequent occurrence of long vowels: Proto-Polynesian *kehe > kē.

Māori retains all the vowels Proto-Oceanic had, but they underwent systematic changes:
 Proto-Polynesian *u >  in the second syllable (an innovation found in all Nuclear Polynesian languages)
 word-initially, *a >  (a Tahitic innovation)
 sometimes *a >  (occurs in many Polynesian languages irregularly)

One of the many examples of irregular changes that happened in Māori is Proto-Polynesian *lima ('hand') > Māori , although a related word *lima ('five') turned into  in Māori; another one is a change from Proto-Eastern-Polynesian *aanuanua ('rainbow') > ānuanua in Tahitian while becoming āniwaniwa in Māori.

Many of them occur due to metathesis, or the rearranging of sounds. In Māori's case metathesis switches adjacent vowels, consonants or syllables; in addition to that there exists a rare type of metathesis that involves sound features instead of segments: in tenga ~ kenakena ('Adam's apple') the consonants' place of articulation changes while retaining nasality; in inohi ~ unahi ('scales') the subject of metathesis is the vowel labialisation, but not the vowel height.

Linguists studied several recordings of Māori and English speakers of different ages that had been made in the 1940s by the New Zealand Broadcasting Service and concluded that the change indeed took place. As an example, the frequency of four realizations of the phoneme spelt  in an informant born in the 19th century can be found below (individual percentages rounded):
  50%
  18%
  13%
  20%

 recording from 1947, informant born in 1885: 6% aspirated
 recording from 2001, informant born in 1934: 49% aspirated
 recording from 2001, informant born in 1972: 88% aspirated

Orthography

Regional variations

Although modern Māori has largely been standardised around the form which was primarily formerly found in the central North Island, historically regional variations did exist, one of which — Southern Māori — has been revived to a very limited extent. This dialect displays marked phonological variations, notably in the existence of apocope.

See also 
 New Zealand English phonology

Notes

References

Bibliography 
 
 
 
 

Māori language
Austronesian phonologies